This list of presidents of the Human Genetics Society of Australasia (HGSA) includes all presidents since the society's creation in 1977.

Presidents

References

Genetics organizations
Human Genetics Society of Australasia
Lists of presidents of organizations
Organizations established in 1977